Locust Hill is an unincorporated community in Breckinridge County, Kentucky, United States. Locust Hill had a post office from June 4, 1909, to February 22, 1985.

Its name came from a nearby hill that was covered with locust trees.

References

Unincorporated communities in Breckinridge County, Kentucky
Unincorporated communities in Kentucky